Manya Reiss (also known as Maria Aerova, sometimes spelled 
Ayerova, 1900–1962) was an American Marxist–Leninist and a founding 
member of the Communist Party USA (CPUSA). 
 
Manya Reiss was of Russian-Jewish origin and immigrated to the United States in 1912. In the United States, 
she was a garment worker as well as a communist activist. In 1931, she attended the International Lenin School. After this, she worked for the Eastern Secretariat of 
the Comintern and was later sent on missions to Germany and 
France. She returned to the United States in the 
late 1930s to work for the propaganda department of the Communist 
Party USA and to teach at a party school. By 
1940, she had returned to Moscow.

In 1957, a few years after the death of Stalin, Reiss went to 
Beijing, China to work for the Beijing Daily and the 
Xinhua News Agency. 
 
Manya Reiss died of cancer in Beijing and was buried at 
the Babaoshan Revolutionary Cemetery.

References

1900 births
1962 deaths
Members of the Communist Party USA
American expatriates in China
American people of Russian-Jewish descent
Jewish Chinese history
Chinese Jews
Chinese people of Russian-Jewish descent
International Lenin School alumni
Burials at Babaoshan Revolutionary Cemetery
American expatriates in the Soviet Union
Xinhua News Agency people